Rasmus Skylstad (11 July 1893 – 17 October 1972) was a Norwegian diplomat.

He was born in Hjørundfjord. He worked as a secretary in the Norwegian Ministry of Foreign Affairs from 1924. He served as permanent under-secretary of state of the Ministry from 1948 to 1958. He was the Norwegian ambassador to France from 1958. He was decorated Commander with Star of the Royal Norwegian Order of St. Olav in 1946.

References

1893 births
1972 deaths
People from Møre og Romsdal
Ambassadors of Norway to France
Recipients of the St. Olav's Medal